Hans von Zedlitz (1890–1948) was a German film actor.

Selected filmography
 The Living Dead (1919)
 Dancer of Death (1920)
 The Last Waltz (1934)
 Just Once a Great Lady (1934)
 Hard Luck Mary (1934)
 A Night of Change (1935)
 She and the Three (1935)

References

Bibliography
 Waldman, Harry. Nazi Films In America, 1933-1942. McFarland & Co, 2008.

External links

1890 births
1948 deaths
German male film actors
German male stage actors
Male actors from Berlin
20th-century German male actors